The Shooter (released under the alternative title Hidden Assassin) is a 1995 American action drama film directed by Ted Kotcheff and starring Dolph Lundgren as a deputy United States Marshal who gets caught up in politics when he is hired to solve the assassination of a Cuban ambassador.

There are two versions released for this film: the international cut running 104 minutes, and the shorter cut running 89 minutes, released in the U.S. and France.

The movie was filmed mainly in the Czech Republic, in Prague.

Plot
A CIA agent gets caught up in political intrigue after he gets brought in to solve the murder of a Cuban ambassador.

Cast

Dolph Lundgren as U.S. Marshal Michael Dane
Maruschka Detmers as Simone Rosset
Assumpta Serna as Marta
Gavan O'Herlihy as Dick Powell
John Ashton as  Alex Reed
Simón Andreu as Alberto Torena
Pablo Scola as Belgado
Petr Drozda as Marcus
Roslav Walter as Police Captain
Pavel Vokoun as Henchman
Martin Hub as Henchman
Jiri Kraus as Cab Driver
Guilio Kukurugya as Cuban Ambassador
Enid Rose as Mistress

Production

Filming
The story was initially set in France but was changed to the Czech Republic.

References

External links
 
 
 

1995 films
1995 action thriller films
1990s crime action films
1995 crime thriller films
American action thriller films
American crime thriller films
American crime action films
English-language Czech films
Czech action thriller films
Czech crime thriller films
English-language French films
French crime action films
French action thriller films
French crime thriller films
American independent films
Films shot in the Czech Republic
Films scored by Stefano Mainetti
Films with screenplays by Billy Ray
1990s English-language films
Films directed by Ted Kotcheff
1990s American films
1990s French films